Argentina is a nation that has competed at the Hopman Cup tournament on five occasions, the first being at the 7th annual staging in 1995. In 2005, Argentina were the tournament runners-up and this remains their best showing to date.

Players
This is a list of players who have played for Argentina in the Hopman Cup.

Results

1 In the 2005 tie against Germany, German opponent Tommy Haas strained his thigh muscle whilst leading in the men's singles match. He was forced to retire from the match and was unable to compete in the mixed doubles, thus defaulting two points to Argentina. In the final against Slovakia, the Argentinian team chose not to compete in the mixed doubles dead rubber.

References

Hopman Cup teams
Hopman Cup